J. Stewart Aitchison  is a Scottish scientist and researcher in the area of photonics. Aitchson is known for his work on nonlinear optics. He is professor in the University of Toronto's Electrical and Computer Engineering department. Aitchson was made an IEEE fellow in 2019.

Education 
Aitchison gained his Bachelor's degree in 1984 from Heriot-Watt University. In 1987, he received his PhD from Heriot-Watt.

Career 
Aitchison is a renowned scientist in the field of nonlinear optics. He has written over 250 journal articles. Aitchison is professor of photonics at the University of Toronto's Electrical and Computer Engineering department and Theme Lead in Public Health at IC-IMPACTS. Aitchison previously served as the director of the university's Emerging Communications Technology Institute (2004-2007) and Vice-Dean of the Faculty of Applied Science & Engineering (2007-2012). 

At the University of Glasgow, he served as a lecturer from 1990 and became professor of photonics in 1999. He left Glasgow in 2001 to join the University of Toronto.

Awards and honours 
Fellow of Institute of Physics, 2001
Fellow of Optica, 2005
Fellow of the American Association for the Advancement of Science, 2010
Elevated to Fellow of the Royal Society of Canada in 2010
2012 University of Toronto Inventor of the Year
Made corresponding fellow of the Royal Society of Edinburgh in 2014
2016 Ontario Professional Engineers Awards Engineering Medal
2016 Connaught Innovation Award
IEEE Photonics Society Distinguished Lecturer from 2016-2017
Made IEEE fellow in 2019 "for contributions to nonlinear optical devices and point-of-care testing systems"

References 

Academic staff of the University of Toronto
Alumni of the University of Glasgow
Alumni of Heriot-Watt University
Fellow Members of the IEEE
Fellows of Optica (society)
Fellows of the Institute of Physics
Fellows of the Royal Society of Canada
Year of birth missing (living people)
Living people